Gaon Weibo Chart, part of Gaon Chart, was a weekly chart that ranked the top 10 most popular K-pop groups and the top 30 most popular individual K-pop artists in China, using data from Weibo. This chart started the week of June 29, 2014. The artists with the most weeks at number one are Jung Yong-hwa with 69 weeks as an individual artist and BTS with 36 weeks as a group. The chart was discontinued in July 2017.

List of number-one artists

2014

2015

2016

2017

Artists with the most weeks at number one

References

South Korean record charts